Dimitrios Kalligeris (1949–2011) was a Greek professional footballer who played for Panathinaikos as a right winger. He was born in Athens, Greece, on 1 January 1949. He started his football career in the Panathinaikos youth system and was member of the team that reached the European Cup of Champions in 1971. He played for Panathinaikos from 1970 to 1972 and later, he played for Kalamata F.C. from 1972 to 1974.

After retirement, he lived in Thebes, Greece. He owned a restaurant and he was an amateur hagiographer. He died in a car accident in the Athens suburb of Nea Ionia.

References

1949 births
2011 deaths
Panathinaikos F.C. players
Road incident deaths in Greece
Footballers from Athens
Greek footballers
Association football forwards